Aguapanela, agua de panela or agüepanela is a drink commonly found throughout South America and a few parts of Central America and Caribbean. Its literal translation means "panela water" as it is an infusion made from panela which is derived from hardened sugar cane juice.

Though recipe variations exist throughout South America, it is most popular in Colombia. In Colombia, it is commonly drunk with a hint of lemon, much the way tea is consumed.

Preparation
Aguapanela is made by adding pieces of panela to water and stirring until the pieces are entirely dissolved. The drink may be served hot or cold, with lemon or lime often being added. In the hot form, sometimes milk or a chunk of cheese is added in place of fruit juice.

In Colombia, black coffee is often prepared with aguapanela instead of water and sugar.

In Costa Rica, panela is combined with hot water or milk to make agua dulce ("sweet water"), a common breakfast drink.

Uses
Many claims have been made about the beneficial effects of aguapanela, based on beliefs such as having more vitamin C than orange juice or as many rehydrating minerals as Gatorade. Popular belief also considers it a helpful drink for the treatment of colds. However, much like softdrinks, it is almost exclusively just sugar water.

Today, aguapanela has gone from being a blue-collar drink to one that can be found in upscale café boutiques in Colombia as a tea.

Canelazo is an alcoholic version of aguapanela with cinnamon and aguardiente added to it. Sugar is rubbed on the edges of the glass when served.

See also
Papelón con limón, a similar drink from Venezuela
Canelazo, an alcoholic variant
Sugarcane juice, for when the input into panela is served without processing
Guarapo (drink), an alcoholic variant of that

References

Non-alcoholic drinks
Colombian cuisine
Latin American cuisine